Fulda pauliani is a species of butterfly in the family Hesperiidae. It is found on Madagascar (the Sambirano district). The habitat consists of forest margins and cleared forests.

References

Butterflies described in 1952
Astictopterini